Teochew Romanization, also known as Swatow Church Romanization, or locally as Pe̍h-ūe-jī (literally "Vernacular orthography"), is an orthography similar to Pe̍h-ōe-jī used to write the Chaoshan dialect (including the Teochew dialect and Swatow dialect). It was introduced by John Campbell Gibson and William Duffus, two British missionaries, to Swatow in 1875.

History
Romanization of Teochew can be traced back to the 1840s. The earliest attempt to write the language in the Latin script was undertaken by Baptist missionary William Dean in his 1841 publication First Lessons in the Tie-chiw Dialect published in Bangkok, Thailand; however, his tonal system was said to be incomplete.

The first complete orthographic system was devised by John Campbell Gibson and William Duffus, two Presbyterianism missionaries, in 1875. The orthography was generally based on the Pe̍h-ōe-jī system, another work of presbyterian origin devised for the Amoy dialect. The first translation of the Gospel of Luke in Swatow romanization was published in 1876. It has been said that the vernacular orthographic system is more easier for illiterate persons to learn in their own mother tongue. 

Besides Gibson and Duffus's original romanization system, several variations of the system were later devised, such as those by William Ashmore (1884) and Lim Hiong Seng (1886).

Other systems developed by Baptist missionaries such as Adele Marion Fielde (1883) and Josiah Goddard (1888) were generally used as a means of phonetic notation instead of a full orthographic system.

Through the church's use of the romanization system, the number of users of the system grew and came to its high point in the 1910s. However, starting in the 1920s, the Chinese government promoted education in Mandarin and more people learned to read and write in Chinese characters. Thus, the promotion of romanized vernacular writing become less necessary. By the 1950s, there were an estimated one thousand users of the system remaining in the Chaoshan area.

Spelling schemes

Alphabet
The orthography uses 18 letters of the basic Latin alphabet.

Initial
The initial consonants in Teochew are listed below:

The letters in the table represent the initial with its pronunciation in IPA, followed by the example of Chinese word and its translation in Teochew romanization.

The affricate consonants ts/ch, tsh/chh, and z/j are three allophone pairs where those voiced and voiceless alveolar affricate will shift to voiced and voiceless alveolo-palatal affricate when they meet with close or close-mid front vowels (i, e).

Finals
The rhymes used in the orthography are listed below:

The latin alphabet sets in the table represent the spelling of syllable final in the system with its pronunciation in IPA, followed by the example of Chinese word and its translation in Teochew romanization.

Nowadays, in most cities in Chaoshan, alveolar codas (-n/-t) have largely shifted to velar codas (-ng/-k), therefore, they are not founds in the Peng'im system which was developed later in the 1960's. However, these codas are still present among native speakers particularly in few border townships like Fenghuang, Sanrao, and Nan'ao.

Tones
There are 8 tones in Teochew and are indicated as below, 

Both the first and the fourth tones are unmarked but can be differenced by their coda-endings; those with the first tone end with an open vowel which could be either simple or nasalised, or end in a nasal consonant such as -m, -n, -ng, while those with the fourth tone end with a stop consonant such as -p, -t, -k, and -h.

Teochew features tone sandhi where for any compound that contains more than one word (a syllable), sandhi rules apply to all words except the last one in each phrase. The tones markings of each word do not actually change to indicate tone sandhi and are written with their original tone markings.

References

Romanization of Chinese
Teochew dialect
Latin-script orthographies